Erythrina sacleuxii is a species of legume in the family Fabaceae. It is found in Kenya and Tanzania.

References

Sources

sacleuxii
Flora of Kenya
Flora of Tanzania
Vulnerable plants
Taxonomy articles created by Polbot